Maciej is a Polish given name, the etymological equivalent of Matthias. Its diminutive forms are Maciek, Maciuś.

Namedays according to Polish calendar: 30 January, 24 February, 14 May

Maciej may refer to:

Arts and entertainment 
 Maciej Cieślak (born 1969), Polish guitarist and songwriter
 Maciej Dunal (1953–2014), Polish actor and singer
 Maciej Fortuna (born 1982), Polish jazz trumpeter, composer and musical educator
 Maciej Golubiewski (born 1976), Consul General at the Consulate General of the Republic of Poland in New York City
 Maciej Jachowski (born 1977), Polish actor
 Maciej Kozłowski (1957–2010), Polish actor
 Maciej Łukaszczyk (1934–2014), Polish pianist
 Maciej Maleńczuk (born 1961), Polish singer, guitarist and poet
 Maciej Małecki (born 1940), Polish composer and pianist
 Maciej Musiał (born 1995), Polish actor
 Maciej Silski (born 1976), Polish singer
 Maciej Stuhr (born 1975), Polish actor, comedian and impressionist
 Maciej Ślesicki (born 1966), Polish director and screenwriter, co-founder of the Warsaw Film School.
 Maciej Wojtyszko (born 1946), Polish film director, screenwriter and fiction author
 Maciej Zembaty (1944–2011), Polish artist, writer, journalist, singer, poet and comedian

Politics 
 Maciej Giertych (born 1936), Polish dendrologist and social conservative politician
 Maciej Golubiewski (born 1976), Polish political scientist and diplomat
 Maciej Górski (1944–2020), Polish politician
 Maciej Nowicki (born 1941), Polish politician, manager and scientist
 Maciej Płażyński (1958–2010), Polish politician and marshal of the Sejm
 Maciej Rataj (1884–1940), Polish politician and writer
 Maciej Świątkowski (born 1950), Polish politician, former member of the Sejm and the Senate

Sports 
 Maciej Bębenek (born 1984), Polish footballer
 Maciej Bielecki (born 1987), Polish cyclist
 Maciej Bodnar (born 1985), Polish road racing cyclist
 Maciej Bydliński (born 1988), Polish alpine skier
 Maciej Dąbrowski (born 1987), Polish footballer
 Maciej Gajos (born 1991), Polish footballer
 Maciej Gębala (born 1994), Polish handball player
 Maciej Górski (born 1990), Polish footballer
 Maciej Hreniak (born 1989), Polish swimmer
 Maciej Iwański (born 1981), Polish footballer
 Maciej Janowski (born 1991), Polish speedway rider
 Maciej Jewtuszko (born 1981), Polish mixed martial artist
 Maciej Korzym (born 1988), Polish footballer
 Maciej Lampe (born 1985), Polish basketball player
 Maciej Pałyszko (born 1978), Polish hammer thrower
 Maciej Piaszczyński (born 1989), Polish speedway rider
 Maciej Pospieszyński, Polish glider aerobatic pilot
 Maciej Rybus (born 1989), Polish footballer
 Maciej Skorża (born 1972), Polish football manager
 Maciej Śliwa (born 2001), Polish footballer
 Maciej Staręga (born 1990), Polish cross-country skier
 Maciej Szczęsny (born 1965), Polish footballer
 Maciej Urbańczyk (born 1995), Polish footballer
 Maciej Zieba (born 1987), Polish-German footballer
 Maciej Żurawski (born 1976), Polish footballer

Other 
 Maciej Cegłowski, Polish-American web developer and writer, owner of the bookmarking service Pinboard
 Maciej Dziewoński (died 1794), Polish priest and Russian spy
 Maciej Franz (born 1969), Polish historian
 Maciej Kranz (born 1964), Polish-American Silicon Valley executive
 Maciej Kuroń (1960–2008), Polish chef, culinary publicist and journalist
 Maciej Łubieński (1572–1652), primate of Poland and archbishop of Gniezno
 Maciej Miechowita (1457–1523), Polish renaissance scholar, professor of Jagiellonian University, historian, chronicler, geographer, and medical doctor
 Maciej Rybiński (1945–2009), Polish journalist, publicist, satirist and writer
 Maciej Kazimierz Sarbiewski (1595–1640), Europe's most prominent Latin poet of the 17th century
 Maciej Stachowiak (born 1976), Polish-American software developer and notable proponent for open source software and web standards, and a leader of the WebKit development team.
 Maciej Stryjkowski (ca. 1547–1593), Polish historian
 Maciej Sulkiewicz (1865–1920), lieutenant general of the Russian Empire, Prime Minister of Crimea, and Chief of General Staff of Azerbaijani Armed Forces
 Maciej Zamoyski, Polish nobleman
 Maciej Zaremba (born 1951), Swedish journalist and author
 Maciej Zień (born 1979), Polish fashion designer
 Maciej Żurowski (1915–2003), Polish historian of French literature and translator

See also 
 

Polish masculine given names